Kitafahrten is an annual multi-day camping trip (fahrten means "trip" or "wanderings") for German kindergarten children, designed to increase responsibility for self and others by placing them in nature and away from their parents. A teacher supervises the children during the camping trip,  and contact with parents is only allowed in emergencies. The concept and the word itself were created by Friedrich Fröbel in the 19th century. He also created  the concept of kindergarten. It is popular in Berlin but not throughout all of Germany.

References

External links
How To Avoid Snakes While Camping

19th-century establishments in Germany
Recurring events established in the 19th century
Annual events in Germany
German culture
Education in Germany
Early childhood education
Childhood in Germany
Camping
Procedural knowledge